Doug Flach (born August 10, 1970) is a former tennis player from the United States.

Flach won two doubles titles during his career. The right-hander reached his highest individual ranking on the ATP Tour on March 21, 1994, when he reached World No. 108. He defeated Andre Agassi (seeded third) in the first round at Wimbledon in 1996 but lost in the third round. He also defeated Agassi in 1997 at Washington, D.C.

Additionally, Flach had career wins over Ivan Lendl, Pat Rafter, Gustavo Kuerten, and Thomas Johansson. Flach won two doubles titles: one with Paul Annacone and the other with Sandon Stolle. He retired in 1999.

Flach was an All-American at the University of Tennessee in 1990.  His older brother Ken was a prominent tour doubles player in the late 1980s and early 1990s.

Career finals

Doubles: (2 titles, 4 runner-ups)

External links
 
 

1970 births
Living people
American male tennis players
Tennis players from St. Louis
Tennessee Volunteers men's tennis players